Briarwood can refer to:

 Briar root wood (tree heath), a type of wood used for making smoking pipes

Communities
United States
 Briarwood, Indiana
 Briarwood, Kentucky
 Briarwood, New Jersey (in Mercer County)
Briarwood East, New Jersey (in Middlesex County)
 Briarwood, Queens, New York
 Briarwood, North Dakota
 Briarwood, Little Rock, Arkansas, a neighborhood

Canada
 Briarwood, Saskatoon, Saskatchewan, a neighbourhood

Other places
United States
 Briarwood College, Connecticut
 Briarwood Elementary School (disambiguation), several 
 Briarwood Mall, Ann Arbor, Michigan
 Briarwood Presbyterian Church, Birmingham, Alabama 
 Briarwood (Charleston, West Virginia), listed on the National Register of Historic Places (NRHP) in 1984
 Briarwood (Virginia Beach, Virginia), listed on the NRHP